Pärnu JK Poseidon is a football club based in Pärnu, Estonia.

It has a reserve team, Pärnu JK Poseidon II, that currently plays in the IV Liiga.

Players

Current squad

Statistics

League and Cup

References

Pärnu JK Poseidon at Estonian Football Association

External links
 Official website 

Pärnu County
Football clubs in Estonia
Association football clubs established in 2013